Kings of War, (often abbreviated to KoW) is a tabletop wargame created by Mantic Games.

The game has been designed for armies of fantasy miniatures. It uses stock fantasy races such as Elves, Dwarves, Undead and Orcs, as well as demonic version of Dwarfs known as Abyssal Dwarfs. Each race has an alignment (good, evil or neutral) and races of the same or compatible alignments can join forces, allowing the player to have a mixed army.

Initially released as a range of miniatures without a set of companion rules, Mantic Games announced in July 2010 that a set of rules was under development. The game was designed by Alessio Cavatore, who previously worked on the rules for The Lord of the Rings Strategy Battle Game, Warmaster, Warhammer 40,000 and Mordheim while working for Games Workshop.

The game was first announced in early 2010 as a closed beta. The 2010 edition of the game was released in September 2010 with the Mhorgoth's Revenge starter set. The rules were finally published as a download from Mantic's website in December 2010.
The 2nd edition of the Kings of War rule book was released in the summer of 2015 and features a cleaned up set of rules, new units in every army and new armies.  In October 2019, in celebration of the 10 year anniversary of Kings of War, Mantic released the 380-page 3rd edition rule book.

Playing Kings of War 

Kings of War is a tabletop wargame where two or more players compete against each other with "armies" of 28mm miniatures.  The rules of the game are published in a short, 12-page document which describes how miniatures are moved, how artillery is used and how combat can be resolved, as well as a limited number of unique rules for each army which define the characteristics, strengths and weaknesses of the race. Games may be played on any appropriate surface, although the standard is a 6 ft by 4 ft tabletop decorated with model scenery in scale with the miniatures.  Any individual or group of miniatures in the game is called a "unit", whether represented by a single model, or group of similar troops.

The game rules are published alongside a series of rosters (or 'army lists') which describe and list the individual statistics for each unit.

All distances in the game are measured in inches and six-sided dice are used to determine the outcome of artillery fire, magic spells and melee.

Kings of War follows an IGOUGO turn style, in which a player makes all of their own actions on their turn, but does not require the other player to take action. The game also lends itself well to timed-games, with support for chess clocks in the rules.

Units and Modelling 

Kings of War's game mechanics revolve around entire units rather than individual models. When units take damage single models are not removed and the units overall fighting ability is not reduced as such, but the more damage a unit acquires the greater the likelihood it will break (in which case the entire unit is removed from the tabletop).

Units come in different sizes: Individuals, Troops, Regiments, Hordes and Legions. The amount of models in a unit depend on the unit type: an infantry regiment has more individual models than a cavalry regiment.

This unit-level system makes Kings of War well suited to large-scale battles and gives gamers the possibility to model their units as dioramas rather than being restricted to rank-and-file blocks of miniatures (providing the dimensions of the unit remain the same). The game's rules allow fewer models to be used in a unit, as long as a minimum number is met.

The minimum number of models that must be fielded in a unit is one more than the unit size below at full strength (eg, an Infantry Regiment of 20 models can be represented by the number of models in a full strength Troop plus one, making 11 models). If there is no smaller unit size, the minimum number is 50%+1. The game's FAQ also provides a higher Preferred Model Count, which increases the threshold to 2/3 of the nominal unit strength: this is the recommended minimum for eligibility for painting awards, while the Minimum Model Count as described above remains legal for tournament play.

Armies 

There are a number of playable armies for Kings of War, represented by official army-lists as well as several fan-created lists, which are not considered canonical to the game.

2nd edition rulebook contains official army lists for 11 "core" armies. They are Forces of the Abyss, Forces of Nature, Undead, Dwarfs, Elves, Abyssal Dwarfs, Goblins, Orcs, Ogres, Basileans and the Kingdoms of Men

In addition, Mantic games provides army lists for other armies in a book called Kings of War: Uncharted Empires. The smaller armies are The League of Rhordia, Ratkin, The Brotherhood, The Empire of Dust, Salamanders, The Herd, The Trident Realm of Neritica, Night-stalkers and The Varangur.

Armies are divided into 3 factions by alignment: Good, Neutral and Evil. Good and Evil armies cannot be mixed in the same army.

Good 
 Basilea
 Dwarfs
 Free Dwarfs
 Elves
 Northern Alliance
 Order of the Brothermark
 Salamanders

Neutral 
 Kingdoms of Men
 Ogres
 The Forces of Nature
 The Herd
 The League of Rhordia
 The Trident Realm of Neritica
Sylvan Kin (Wood Elves)
Order of the Green Lady (Questing Knights devoted to Nature)

Evil 
 Forces of the Abyss
 Abyssal Dwarfs
 Goblins
 Orcs
 Undead
 Twilight Kin
 The Empire of Dust
 Ratkin
Ratkin Slaves
 Varangur
 Night-stalkers

Derivative games 

Mantic Games also released a series of dungeon skirmish games called Dwarf King's Hold which evolved into (and was replaced by) the dungeon-crawl game series Dungeon Saga, the initial game of which having the subtitle The Dwarf King's Quest. They do not share the same rules or game mechanics with Kings of War, but they use the same range of miniatures and are set in the same fictional world of Mantica.

Also set in the same world is Kings of War Vanguard. This uses the same miniatures as Kings of War and Dungeon Saga, as well as some newly commissioned box sets, but has its own rulebook. It is a skirmish game where players control individual models rather than units, with an experience and level up system for its campaign mode. It was released in 2018.

References 

Miniature wargames
Wargames introduced in the 2010s